

References

Former municipalities